Ahmad Noorani is a Pakistani-born investigative journalist based in the United States. He is the co-founder of Fact Focus. Noorani started his career in 2007.

Notable work
In August 2020 he issued a report on the assets of Lt. General Asim Bajwa's family.
In November 2021 he uploaded an audio clip attributed to former Chief Justice of the Supreme Court Saqib Nisar in which he was talking with other unknown people about putting pressure on the sentences of former Prime Minister Nawaz Sharif and his daughter Maryam Nawaz.

Assassination attempts
In October 2017, Noorani was attacked near the Zero Point in Islamabad, armed men on motorcycles forcibly stopped his vehicle and then pulled him out of the vehicle and tortured him.

In November 2021 Noorani's wife, Umbreen Fatima's car was attacked by an unidentified assailant who escaped near her home in Lahore, threatening to kill her.

References

Living people
Pakistani male journalists
Pakistani investigative journalists
Pakistani reporters and correspondents
Year of birth missing (living people)
21st-century Pakistani writers
21st-century journalists
Pakistani emigrants to the United States
Pakistani refugees